The Trumps may refer to:
 Family of Donald Trump, the immediate family of the businessman and 45th President of the United States
 Trump family, the larger German-American family
 The Trumps: Three Generations That Built an Empire, a 2000 biography by Gwenda Blair about the Trump family

See also
Trump (disambiguation)